were officials of the Tokugawa shogunate in Edo period Japan.  Conventional interpretations have construed these Japanese titles as "commissioner", "overseer" or "governor".  This office was created in 1842.  This bakufu title identifies an official responsible for administration of the port of Haneda and foreign trade in the area.  The numbers of men holding the title concurrently would vary over time.

In February 1854, Commodore Matthew C. Perry sailed unimpeded into Edo harbor and anchored his American squadron of ships off the port of Haneda.

List of Haneda bugyō

See also
 Bugyō

Notes

References
 Beasley, William G. (1955).  Select Documents on Japanese Foreign Policy, 1853–1868. London: Oxford University Press. [reprinted by RoutledgeCurzon, London, 2001.  ;  (cloth)]
 Cullen, L. M. (2003). A History of Japan, 1582–1941: Internal and External Worlds. Cambridge: Cambridge University Press.  (cloth)  (paper)
 Naito, Akira, Kazuo Hozumi, and H. Mack Horton. (2003).  Edo, the City that Became Tokyo: An Illustrated History. Tokyo: Kodansha. 

Government of feudal Japan
Officials of the Tokugawa shogunate